Games People Play is an American drama television series, based on the novel Games Divas Play written by Angela Burt-Murray, that premiered on April 23, 2019, on BET.

On November 13, 2019, the series was renewed for a second season, which premiered on October 19, 2021.

Premise
Games People Play takes place "inside the high-stakes world of professional sports where everyone plays to win. With an ensemble cast of dynamic characters including an ambitious reporter, a millionaire basketball player, a desperate housewife, a scandalous groupie, and a murderous stalker, the series follows three women Nia, Vanessa and Laila and the men in their lives.  In a ruthless battle for success, these women's passions and motivations are seldom altruistic, but their life choices and drive will determine what it really takes to stay on top."

Cast

Main
Lauren London as Vanessa King, a desperate basketball wife trying to protect her family
Karen Obilom as Nia Bullock, a tenacious reporter struggling to rebuild her tarnished career and Vanessa's closest friend and confidente
Parker McKenna Posey as Laila James, a scandalous groupie looking to become a star
Sarunas Jackson as Marques King, a professional basketball all star, who played for New York Gladiators, but traded to the Los Angeles Vipers, is married to Vanessa
Jackie Long as Kareem Johnson, Marcus' best friend and assistant, who was a former basketball star for the Gladiators and a college basketball standout
Kendall Kyndall as Marquis "MJ" Jackson, Nia's assistant and best friend (season 2; recurring season 1)
Karrueche Tran as Eden Lazlo, the daughter of the Los Angeles Vipers owner and the newly named VP of basketball operations, who further complicates Marcus' love life (season 2)
Brandi Denise as Quanisha

Recurring
Barry Brewer as Eric Rowland, Nia's live-in boyfriend, an IT nerd who is a basketball all-star captain
Morgan Walsh as Ginger Gates
Monti Washington as Terrence Abrams, Nia's ex-boyfriend and a City of Los Angeles police chief, who wants to pick up where they left off when Nia moves to Los Angeles
Shaun Robinson as Kristen Kensington
Rachel Leyco as Susie Q (A.K.A. Natasha), Laila's friend
Ryan Paevey as Bryce Daniels, a Los Angeles Vipers fan
Kevin McNamera as Coach Kelly Buxton, a coach
Kevin Jackson as Jamal "The Criminal" Jerome, a thief and a drug dealer
Vanessa Bell Calloway as Shelia
Vanessa Simmons as Jackie Herman
Alfredo Tavares as Keaun Stevenson, the coach for the Los Angeles Vipers
Delvon Roe as Dante Herman, a college basketball player, professional basketball player and the husband of Jackie
Phillip G. Carlson as Detective Anderson Loomis
Ismeli Henriquez as Kalinda Walters
Jack Merrill as Detective Frank Thrillin
Tracy Melchior as Roxanne
Chinedu Oji as Ceawen Maduenu, a basketball player for the Tulsa Tornado
Momo Dione as Atebe Sekibo, a Nigerian Gangster
Lourdes Gonzalez as Merlot
Gail Bean as Quanisha
Ben Shields as Gus, a reporter
Mike Bash as Tony, a sports reporter
Jerry Cummings (Frvrose) as Himothy "He-Man" Taylor, a basketball player for the Austin Stallions, traded to the LA Vipers
Cynthia Bailey as Ndasia
Ro Parrish as himself, a Vipers' NBA Commentator.
Hitman Holla as Romello "Rome", the new cocky point guard traded to the Vipers
Leon as Walter, Marques father
Calvin Seabrooks as Andre, a successful ex from MJ's past
Marlo Hampton as Monique, a friend of Vanessa King

Guest
Partial list of guest by last name:
Anisha Adusumilli as Anushka
Terrah Bennett Smith as Rosalind Jackson
Jennie Fahn as Janet, Vanessa's lawyer
Giana Garcia as Deja
Blaine Gray as Cameron Pike, a basketball player
Jamaal Lewis as Handsom Manny
John A. Lorenz as ADA Martin Escovedo
Nazanin Mandi as Zara, wife to new Viper player Tyreck
Aaron Marshall as Theodore Delano
Alveraz Ricardez as Officer Mel Friendly
Jeremie Rivers as Jebediah Hawthorne, a reverend
Ron J. Rock as Jason Brown, a basketball player
Greice Santo as Yoga Nanny
Owen Saxon as Thomas, a trainer and a basketball player for the Los Angeles Vipers
Marie Stark as Deanna George
Norman Towns as Tyreck Woolridge, a basketball player for the Tulsa Tornado
Shabnam Yusufzai as Ana Reyes, a housekeeper
Zach Zublena as Jasper White, a basketball player for the Tulsa Tornado

Episodes

Series overview

Season 1 (2019)

Season 2 (2021)

Production

Development
On April 17, 2018, it was announced that BET had the production a series order for a first season consisting of ten episodes. Executive producers were set to include Tracey Edmonds, Angela Burt-Murray, and Vanessa Middleton, who was also expected to act as showrunner. Production companies involved with the series were slated to consist of Edmonds Entertainment. On December 6, 2018, it was reported that Middleton would write the pilot episode of the series and serve as a co-showrunner alongside Kim Newton, who will also executive produce. On January 31, 2019, it was announced that the series had been retitled Games People Play. On April 1, 2019, it was announced that the series will premiere on April 23, 2019.

On November 13, 2019, the series was renewed for a second season, which premiered on October 19, 2021.

Casting
On December 6, 2018, it was announced that Lauren London, Parker McKenna Posey, and Karen Obilom had been cast in leading roles. On January 31, 2019, it was reported that Sarunas J. Jackson and Jackie Long had joined the main cast and that Barry Brewer and Kendall Kyndall would appear in a recurring capacity.

On September 10, 2020, it was announced that Karrueche Tran will join the series for Season 2. It was also announced that Lauren London will appear in a limited role and Kendall Kyndall will join the main cast.

Filming
Principal photography for the series commenced on November 29, 2018, in Los Angeles, California.

References

External links

2010s American drama television series
2020s American drama television series
2019 American television series debuts
BET original programming
English-language television shows